Poultry (formerly also Poultrey) is a short street in the City of London, which is the historic nucleus and modern financial centre of London. It is an eastern continuation of Cheapside, between Old Jewry and Mansion House Street, towards Bank junction.

Etymology
Poultry takes its name, like other roads nearby such as Milk Street and Bread Street, from the various produce once sold at Cheapside (meaning "market-place" in Old English). John Stow, writing at the end of the 16th century, noted that "the poulterers are but lately departed from thence into other streets".

History

The thoroughfare was also known for some time as Conningshop Lane/Coneys shop lane due to the brace of three stuffed coney skins over a notable poulterer's stall, thus who also served game. From the 15th to early 17th century, the lane had several taverns, but few were rebuilt after the Great Fire of 1666.

Part of north side hosted the church of Saint Mildred. Rebuilt after the Great Fire to the designs of Sir Christopher Wren, it was demolished in 1872 and its site used to build the Gresham Life Assurance office. In 1891, Henry B. Wheatley wrote that, with the removal of the church, "the clearing away of the old houses on both sides of the way, and the erection in their place of large blocks of offices and shops of considerable architectural pretensions, and the general widening of the thoroughfare, the Poultry has since 1850 been entirely changed in character and aspect." 

The street gave its name to a prison, Poultry Compter. It was a brick building in its heyday having fifteen wards, of which one for Jews. It was closed in the early 19th century and its prisoners transferred to the new White Cross/Whitecross Street Compter/Prison.

Notable buildings
Although short it is lined by notable buildings. No 1 Poultry is a postmodern office and retail building which is home to the Coq d'Argent restaurant, which includes a rooftop terrace and formal garden, and takes up what were numbers 1 to 17. Opposite, a wide alley, Grocers' Hall Court, leads to the livery hall of the Worshipful Company of Grocers, one of the City's original twelve great livery companies that ranks second in their order of precedence. Its main entrance is on Princes Street.

The bulk of the north side 27–35 Poultry was the London headquarters of Midland Bank, a Grade I listed building.  It was the filming set kept secret from viewers for Channel 4 game show The Bank Job, broadcast in 2012.

References

Sources
* Google Maps

Streets in the City of London